Sary-Arka Airport  is the airport of Karagandy, Kazakhstan.

History
The airport was built in 1934, on a site at the edge of the city centre, and moved further out to its current location in 1944. The old terminal building on Shturman Street still stands, now occupied by a market for car parts. In 1980 it underwent major reconstruction, including the construction of a new terminal building and modernization of the runway. This made the landing of heavier aircraft possible and opened the door to many new destinations in the Soviet Union.

In 1992, the airport was granted international status. It has become an independent joint stock company after separation from JSC "Karagandaavia" in 1997. It is not related to Saryarka – Steppe and Lakes of Northern Kazakhstan on the World Heritage List.

Sary-Akra Airport is home to the 610th Air Base of the Armed Forces of the Republic of Kazakhstan, one of four fast jet bases in the country with MiG-31s, Su-27s and Su-25s.

The airport is usually used as the staging area from which returning crewmembers of the International Space Station are flown to their respective home bases at the Yuri Gagarin Cosmonaut Training Center, the Johnson Space Center or the European Astronaut Centre following a traditional welcome ceremony upon landing in their Soyuz (spacecraft) capsule.

Airlines and destinations

Passenger

Cargo

References

External links

Sary-Arka Airport

Saryarka – Steppe and Lakes of Northern Kazakhstan at UNESCO website

Airports built in the Soviet Union
Airports in Kazakhstan
Airport Saryarka
Military installations of Kazakhstan
Kazakh Air Defense Forces